IHCC may refer to:

FIA International Hill Climb Cup
International Holocaust Cartoon Competition
Inver Hills Community College